Ose is a Local Government Area in Ondo State in the South Western part of Nigeria. Its headquarter is in the town of Ifon. It is made up communities including Ikaro, Okeluse, Ijagba, Imoru, Arimogija, Elegbeka (Ikaro), Ogberuwen, Ute, Ifon, Omi-alafa, Ugbonla, and Ogbese Falodun in the south and Ido-ani, Idogun, Afo, and Imeri in the north.

 
The major activity of this region is farming, mostly based around cocoa and plantation farming.
Oba Isreal Adegoke Adewusi, King of the town of ifon the local government headquarters, was murdered on the 26th November 2020.
It has an area of 1,465 km and a population of 144,901 at the 2006 census.

The postal code of the area is 341.

References

Local Government Areas in Ondo State
Local Government Areas in Yorubaland